Orley, Örley or van Orley are given names and family names.

 People with given name Orley
 Orley May (1897-1968), an American detective
 Orley Ashenfelter (born 1942), an American economist
Orley Limpangog (born 1991), A Filipino Artist
 People with surname Orley
 Bernard van Orley (between 1487 and 1491–1541), a leading artist in Dutch and Flemish Renaissance painting
 Jan van Orley (1665–1735), a Flemish painter, draughtsman, printmaker and designer
 Ladislaus Örley, a helminthologist
 Richard van Orley (1663–1732), a Flemish painter, draughtsman, printmaker and designer
 Thomas Orley (1934–2008), an American fencer

See also
 Orley Farm (disambiguation)